Källbrinks Idrottsplats or simply Källbrinks IP is a football stadium in Huddinge, Sweden and the home stadium for the football team Huddinge IF. Källbrinks IP has a total capacity of 2 500 spectators.

References 

Football venues in Sweden